Little b is a domain-specific programming language, more specifically, a modeling language, designed to build modular mathematical models of biological systems.  It was designed and authored by Aneil Mallavarapu.  Little b is being developed in the Virtual Cell Program at Harvard Medical School, headed by mathematician Jeremy Gunawardena.

This language is based on Lisp and is meant to allow modular programming to model biological systems.  It will allow more flexibility to facilitate rapid change that is required to accurately capture complex biological systems.

The language draws on techniques from artificial intelligence and symbolic mathematics, and provides  syntactic conveniences derived from object-oriented languages.  The language was originally denoted with a lowercase b (distinguishing it from B, the predecessor to the widely used C programming language, but the name was eventually changed to "little b" to avoid confusion and to pay homage to Smalltalk.

References
Krieger K "Life in Silico: A Different Kind of Intelligent Design" Science 312(5771):189–190
https://arstechnica.com/uncategorized/2008/07/little-b-project-creates-biology-specific-programming-system/
https://www.computerworld.com/article/2551598/big-things-from-little-b.html

External links
Biology enters 'The Matrix' through new computer language EurekAlert article

Programming languages
Dynamic programming languages
Dynamically typed programming languages
Object-oriented programming languages
Lisp (programming language)
Specification languages
Cross-platform free software
Programming languages created in 2004